Petrovo-Borkovsky is a rural locality (a settlement) in Yasenkovskoye Rural Settlement, Bobrovsky District, Voronezh Oblast, Russia. The population was 124 as of 2010.

Geography 
Petrovo-Borkovsky is located 13 km southwest of Bobrov (the district's administrative centre) by road. Yasenki is the nearest rural locality.

References 

Rural localities in Bobrovsky District